The Nagpur Metropolitan Region Development Authority (NMRDA) is the urban planning agency of Nagpur in the Indian state of Maharashtra. It replaced the erstwhile Nagpur Improvement Trust. It was set up for the purposes of planning, co-ordination, supervising, promoting and securing the planned development of the Nagpur Metropolitan Region. It coordinates the development activities of municipal corporations, municipalities, and other local authorities.

References 

State agencies of Maharashtra
State urban development authorities of India
Nagpur
Year of establishment missing